Greenodd railway station was on the route between Ulverston and Lakeside, built by the Furness Railway. It served the village of Greenodd, then in Lancashire and now in Cumbria, England, and trains were withdrawn from 30 September 1946 but was not officially closed until 1955. Train movements through the station continued until 1965, with the closure of the line to Lakeside.

A section of the line has reopened as part of the Lakeside and Haverthwaite Railway, but the station itself has since been demolished and the trackbed between itself and to the south towards Ulverston used for road improvements. However, if you walk down by the embankment of the estuary, you will see the east side platform buried underneath the road grass verge, with some remnants of the back wall and shelter building visible as well.

References

Further reading
 

Furness
Disused railway stations in Cumbria
Former Furness Railway stations
Railway stations in Great Britain opened in 1869
Railway stations in Great Britain closed in 1940
Railway stations in Great Britain opened in 1946
Railway stations in Great Britain closed in 1955
1869 establishments in England